Llimphiq (Quechua llimphi, llimp'i a painting / the color for painting, -q a suffix "painted" or "painter", Hispanicized spelling Llempic) is a mountain in the Wansu mountain range in the Andes of Peru, about  high. It is located in the Arequipa Region, La Unión Province, Puyca District. It lies southwest of the lakes named Ikmaqucha and Huch'uyqucha (Quechua for "small lake", Uchuycocha).

See also 
 Janq'u Q'awa
 Pilluni
 Puka Ranra

References 

Mountains of Peru
Mountains of Arequipa Region